Alexander Leibkind (19 October 1952, Munich, Germany – 18 May 2006, New York, New York) was a German judoka and sports manager. He was a member of the German Judo national team from 1971–1979, and participated in the 1976 Olympics as a lightweight (63-kg class). He served as general manager of Düsseldorf-based American football team Rhein Fire of NFL Europe from 1996 through 2004. He managed Düsseldorf's bid for the 2012 Summer Olympics

Sources

ALEXANDER LEIBKIND VERSTORBEN, Alles Ausser Sport 

1952 births
2006 deaths
German male judoka
Judoka at the 1976 Summer Olympics
Olympic judoka of West Germany
Sportspeople from Munich